John Forney may refer to:

John Horace Forney (1829–1901), Confederate general in the American Civil War
John Weiss Forney (1818–1881), American journalist and politician
John Forney, former energy trader convicted of fraud, see Death Star (business)